Ashford United F.C. was an English football club based in Ashford, Kent. The side was formed in 1880 and won the Kent Senior Cup in 1893. A year later the club became founder members of the Kent League. The club played home games at Godinton Road. The club entered the FA Cup in 1893–1894, and were beaten by Arsenal 12–0. in the first qualifying round. United withdrew from the Kent League in 1906 and the club was closed down.

References

Defunct football clubs in England
Association football clubs established in 1880
Association football clubs disestablished in 1906
1880 establishments in England
1906 disestablishments in England
Ashford, Kent
Defunct football clubs in Kent